Champs Elysees (21 March 2003 – 19 December 2018) was a Thoroughbred racehorse who has competed successfully in Europe and North America.

Racing career
Raced at age three from a base in France, Champs-Elysees had his best results in Conditions races with a second in the Prix Daphnis and the Prix du Prince d'Orange. At age four, he won the 2007 Prix d'Hédouville at Longchamp Racecourse in Paris and late in the year was sent to race in North America. He won important stakes races in 2008 including the Grade 1 Hollywood Turf Cup Stakes, and capped off his career with his most important win ever in the October 17, 2009 Canadian International Stakes at Woodbine Racetrack in Toronto.

Stud career
Retired from racing, Champs Elysees began standing at stud during the 2010 season at Banstead Manor Stud in Suffolk, England In Nov 2016 purchased by Coolmore - At stud at Castlehyde Stud, Ireland, He died of a heart attack on 19 December 2018.

Among his first crop of foals was the Ascot Gold Cup winner Trip To Paris and the 2018 & 2019 Australian Cup winner Harlem. He also sired the 1000 Guineas and Sun Chariot Stakes winner Billesdon Brook.

Notable progeny

c = colt, f = filly, g = gelding''

References

 Champs Elysees' pedigree and partial racing stats

2003 racehorse births
2018 racehorse deaths
Racehorses bred in the United Kingdom
Racehorses trained in France
Racehorses trained in the United States
Thoroughbred family 11